Thomas Fortin (December 15, 1853 – March 31, 1933) was a lawyer, judge, educator and political figure in Quebec, Canada. He represented Laval in the House of Commons of Canada from 1896 to 1901 as a Liberal.

He was born in St-François-de-la-Beauce, Beauce County, Canada East, the son of Joseph Fortin and Marie-Louis Vachon. He studied law at the Université Laval and was admitted to the Quebec bar in 1882. Fortin was professor of civil and municipal law at McGill University. Fortin settled at Sainte-Rose in Laval County in 1885. He resigned his seat in the House of Commons in 1901 after he was named to the Quebec Superior Court for Montreal district.

Fortin retired from the bench in December 1919. He died at Sainte-Rose-de-Laval at the age of 79.

He was the father of Marc-Aurèle Fortin

References 
 

Liberal Party of Canada MPs
Members of the House of Commons of Canada from Quebec
Judges in Quebec
1853 births
1933 deaths
People from Chaudière-Appalaches
Université Laval alumni
Academic staff of McGill University